Sheopur Assembly constituency is one of the 230 Vidhan Sabha (Legislative Assembly) constituencies of Madhya Pradesh state in central India. This constituency came into existence in 1951, as Sheopur Pohri, one of the 79 Vidhan Sabha constituencies of the erstwhile Madhya Bharat state.

Sheopur (constituency number 1) is one of the two Vidhan Sabha constituencies located in Sheopur district. This constituency covers the entire Sheopur sub-division.

Sheopur is part of Morena Lok Sabha constituency in Morena district.

Members of Legislative Assembly
As Sheopur Pohri constituency of Madhya Bharat:
 1951: Soma, Indian National Congress / Udaybhan Singh, Indian National Congress
As a constituency of Madhya Pradesh:
 1977: Gulab Singh, Janata Party
 1980: Badri Prasad, Indian National Congress (I)
 1985: Satyabhanu Chauhan, Indian Congress (Socialist)
 1990: Gulab Singh, Bharatiya Janata Party
 1993: Rama Shankar Bhardwaj, Bharatiya Janata Party
 1998: Brijraj Singh, Independent
 2003: Durgalal Vijay, Bharatiya Janata Party
 2008: Brijraj Singh, Indian National Congress
 2013: Durgalal Vijay, Bharatiya Janata Party
 2018: Babu Jandel, Indian National Congress

Election results

2018 results

2008 results

See also
 Sheopur

References

Assembly constituencies of Madhya Pradesh
Sheopur district